Lorraine Peter, (née Netro; May 24, 1956) is a Canadian politician. She represented the electoral district of Vuntut Gwitchin in the Yukon Legislative Assembly from 2000 to 2006. She was a member of the Yukon New Democratic Party.

She originally ran for election under her maiden name, but married during her first year in office and used her married name, Peter, for the remainder of her political career.

Political career

Peter was first elected in the 2000 Yukon election in the Old Crow riding of Vuntut Gwitchin on behalf of the New Democrats. She succeeded former New Democrat MLA and Speaker of the Yukon Legislative Assembly, Robert Bruce. The New Democrat government was defeated in that campaign and Peter joined the Official Opposition.

In 2002, Peter was re-elected in Vuntut Gwitchin. During the 31st Legislative Assembly, Peter served as Official Opposition critic for the Departments of Environment and Justice, the Women's Directorate, and for First Nations issues. She was also Caucus Chair.

Peter was defeated by Yukon Liberal Darius Elias in the 2006 Yukon election. It was the first time the Liberals had won the riding of Vuntut Gwitchin.

Personal life

A Gwich'in from Old Crow, Peter later served as a councillor and Deputy Chief of the Vuntut Gwitchin First Nation after leaving territorial politics. She is also a former member of the Board of Directors of Gwich'in Council International, a permanent participant of the Arctic Council.

Electoral record

2006 general election

|-
 
| style="width: 130px" |Liberal
|Darius Elias
|align="right"|65
|align="right"|45.8%
|align="right"|+22.0%

|NDP
|Lorraine Peter
|align="right"|40
|align="right"|28.2%
|align="right"|-19.3%

|- bgcolor="white"
!align="left" colspan=3|Total
!align="right"|142
!align="right"|100.0%
!align="right"| –

2002 general election

|-

|NDP
|Lorraine Peter
|align="right"|68
|align="right"|47.5%
|align="right"|+9.8%

 
| style="width: 130px" |Liberal
|Joe Tetlichi
|align="right"|34
|align="right"|23.8%
|align="right"|-9.5%
|- bgcolor="white"
!align="left" colspan=3|Total
!align="right"|143
!align="right"|100.0%
!align="right"| –

2000 general election

|-

|NDP
|Lorraine Netro
|align="right"|69
|align="right"|37.7%
|align="right"|-17.3%
 
| style="width: 130px" |Liberal
|Esau Schafer
|align="right"|61
|align="right"|33.3%
|align="right"| +33.3%

|- bgcolor="white"
!align="left" colspan=3|Total
!align="right"|183
!align="right"|100.0%
!align="right"| –

References

1956 births
Living people
21st-century First Nations people
First Nations politicians
First Nations women in politics
Vuntut Gwitchin people
Women MLAs in Yukon
Yukon New Democratic Party MLAs
21st-century Canadian women politicians